Adriana Neumann de Oliveira (born 25 January 1980) is a Brazilian mathematician specializing in interacting particle systems, awarded by the L'Oréal-UNESCO Prizes for women in science in 2016. She is a professor in the Department of Pure and Applied Mathematics of the Federal University of Rio Grande do Sul.

Neumann earned her Ph.D. in 2011 at the Instituto Nacional de Matemática Pura e Aplicada.

She is an affiliate member of the Brazilian Academy of Sciences, elected in 2020.

References

External links 
 Video produced by L'Oréal Brasil on Adriana Neumann

1980 births
Living people
21st-century Brazilian mathematicians
Brazilian women mathematicians
21st-century women mathematicians
Academic staff of the Federal University of Rio Grande do Sul
Place of birth missing (living people)